Adesvaldo José de Lima (born 17 September 1962), commonly known as Lima , is a Brazilian retired footballer who played as forward.

Career
Born in Camapuã, Mato Grosso do Sul, Lima started in Operário-MS. After being top-scorer of the 1982 and 1983 Campeonato Sul-Mato-Grossense, he joined Corithians in 1984, who loaned him to Santos. In 1987, he moved to Grêmio, where he would take part in Campeonato Gaúcho titles in 1987 and 1988, being top-scorer in the latter, alongside Valdo, Cuca, Astengo and Mazarópi.

He then moved to Portugal, joining Benfica, where he would reunite with Valdo, playing sparsely throughout three seasons, but notably scoring three goals in the 1989–90 European Cup campaign, on the way to the final. In 1991, he signed with Internacional, winning another Campeonato Gaúcho, and then moving through a number of clubs, retiring at age 35.

In 2012, he ran for the city council in Campo Grande for the Brazilian Labour Party.

References

External links
 
 

1962 births
Living people
Brazilian footballers
Sportspeople from Mato Grosso do Sul
Operário Futebol Clube (MS) players
Sport Club Corinthians Paulista players
Santos FC players
Grêmio Foot-Ball Porto Alegrense players
S.L. Benfica footballers
Sport Club Internacional players
America Football Club (RJ) players
Cerro Porteño players
Esporte Clube Vitória players
Grêmio Esportivo Brasil players
Paraguayan Primera División players
Primeira Liga players
Brazilian expatriate footballers
Brazilian expatriate sportspeople in Portugal
Expatriate footballers in Portugal
Brazilian expatriate sportspeople in Paraguay
Expatriate footballers in Paraguay
Association football forwards